Missing is a series of Japanese light novels by Gakuto Coda, published by MediaWorks under their Dengeki Bunko label. The first novel in the series was adapted into a manga, which was released in English by Tokyopop along with the novels. Missing is a modern fantasy and horror series involving five high school students dealing with a series of supernatural events.

Characters
These names are in Japanese naming order, family name first, then given name.  All the students are second year students except Togano.
 Utsume Kyoichi - "The Shadow" "The Dark Lord of the Human World"
 Generally addressed as "Dark Lord" by most classmates, as "The Shadow" by Togano Yomiko, he is a walking library of supernatural knowledge. While handsome, his eyes are piercing, and he often frightens people. As a child he and his younger brother Souji were captured by a kami-kakushi, which left Utsume with the ability to smell the other world. His brother never returned. Utsume later learned that black is the color of mourning and began to always wears black clothing. He has amassed an immense amount of 'black' knowledge. He is always unemotional and poker-faced, and never expects anything from anyone. While he never expresses any such desire, he secretly longs for death. He also denies passionately the existence of love -- "Affection is an extension of possessive feelings," he claims.  When he met Ayame she told him "You have no idea what it's like to fall." Member of the literature club. He lives, on bad terms, with his father.
 Ayame - "Kami-kakushi" "The Wind that Longs for Human Form"
 Fragile but beautiful girl with a lonely smile. Utsume introduces her as his new girlfriend, and is caught off guard when they ask her last name; he gives her name as "Kondou", the same name as one of his friends...but only because he could think of no better names in time. It is suggested that her name, "Ayame", is an old and uncommon name. Her black hair and dark red clothing stand out. Sings beautiful songs, which have the power to resist beings from the other world. She herself was once a creature of this world, and ordinary humans are unable to detect her presence unless introduced to her. Said to be 16 years old but looks two or three years younger. Always nervous and retiring.  Few details are provided about her life. It is rare to see or hear of her without Utsume being nearby.
 Murakami Toshiya - "Schäferhund," later "Loup-garou"
 A traumatic incident in their childhoods left him very protective of Utsume and his other friends. Fears the other world, is very tall, and athletic. His uncle trained him in an unusual variant of karate. His home is the only shrine in Hazama city. He is called 'Schäferhund' by Togano Yomiko. She explains to him that it means 'German Shepherd', but that the German name for the dog sounds better. Toshiya is a member of the literature club. He lives with his parents, neighboring Utsume's home.
 Kidono Aki - "The Glass Beast"
 Cool, with an acid tongue. Describes herself as a literary girl brought up wrong. Badly bullied as a child, which gave her a fearsome pride. She preserves her own ego by looking down on others. Fears group activities because of her experiences, and is one of the few students to live alone in an apartment, in an apartment building called 'Charme Miyako', an ordinary building which has four apartments in it, near the school. She calls Utsume "Kyo-no-ji" and harbors feelings for him in secret. Which means she does particularly care for Ayame. Member of the literature club. Her mother's ancestors have a heritage of Inugami-suji, which runs in their blood and Aki's blood.
 Kondou Takemi - "The One Who Remembers"
 A very ordinary boy. Acutely aware of this, which makes him admire strange people. Number one member of the Utsume fanclub, but that leads to tragic results. The only member of the main six cast members whose past remains unknown, but his parents appear to be alive and well. The most feminine looking of the male characters. Has a bell which leads to the other world hanging from his cell phone strap. Outgoing, and friendly with Ryoko, the other ordinary member of the literature club.  He lives in the boys' dorm.  His roommate is Okimoto.
 Kusakabe Ryoko - "The Gentle Mirror"
 Too capable of sympathizing with others, a bright and kind girl. Has many friends, but this often puts her in danger. Has a complicated background. Second member of Utsume's fanclub, but in love with Takemi. She was the last person to see Utsume on this side. She lives in the girls' dorm.  Her roommate is Nukata Nozomi.
 Togano Yomiko - "The Witch"
 A third year student at the school. Calls herself a witch, and the name has caught on. A mysterious individual prone to deep pronouncements. Unnaturally innocent. Entirely lacks malice*. Toshiya says that she can almost always be found at the pond in the school garden. She likes to stand there, looking at the sky and smiling to herself.  She said "There was no meaning, just a reason... Remember: the world is a story..."  Utsume answers that she is insane and she replies that they are both insane.
 Jinno Kageyuki - "The Dark Lord of the Night" "Darkness Given Name" "Supporter of All Good and Evil" "The First Magician" "The Granter"
 Darkness. Gave Takemi the bell. Unclear if he was ever human — his existence is a mystery. Discovered too many secrets, and became magic itself. At his first meeting with Takemi and Toshiya he told them that Ayame was once human but fell to the other side, and has gone mad from the loneliness.  He thought that they have an extremely low chance of success, and they will likely have to kill Ayame, "though that is so hard when she is already dead." Had no desires, but loves change.
 Ozaki Matsukata - "The Occultist" "The Magician Hanging from the Tree of the World"
 Wrote under the pen name Oosako Eiichiro. One of the founders of Seisou Academy, left many magical items behind in the school. His books contain many accounts of genuine supernatural events, and reading them can cause those events to occur. The Agency has carefully removed these books from general circulation. This did not stop Utsume from acquiring several of them through private channels. Hanged himself from a tree on school grounds. Has a horribly twisted smile, showing the pure malice in his heart.
 Kijou Yutaka -
 The first 'man in black' presented in the novels, in Volume 1 Chapter 4 "Thus Spoke the Magic Hunter". He thinks Aki and Ryoko are intelligent and likeable. They remind him of his daughter, who is the same age and enrolled in a private high school. He hasn't seen his daughter since he joined The Agency, and like all agents is officially listed as 'dead'. He will not let his sentiments interfere with the duties of his responsibilities. The Agency will watch Aki and Ryoko. Once the current matter [Volume 1, 'Missing/Spirited Away'] has been resolved Aki and Ryoko will have their memories erased.
 Haga Mikihiko - "The Man in Black"
 One of the men in black from urban legends. An Agent, working for The Agency. The Agency has a powerful influence upon society, and can easily make a few dozen deaths disappear. Often appears before Utsume, giving information and orders concerning supernatural events. Refers to Utsume as 'an experiment.'
 The Agency
 A governmental unit whose mission is to counter and push back the creatures of the other world.  They apply scientific methods in order to develop better methods of combating the other world.  At the same time they have found that wider knowledge of the supernatural provides openings for those creatures to rise from the subconscious ooze to our conscious world.  Therefore The Agency seeks to classify and remove any 'true' account about the other world.  They are capable of erasing a person's memories.

Media

Light novels
There are thirteen light novels in the Missing series.

Manga
Three volumes long, adapting the first Missing novel, with art by Rei Mutsuki. Tokyopop has published the series in English since August 2007.

Reception
Anime News Network gave the first Missing novel a positive review, citing, "Moody atmosphere, engaging characters and folklore-based storyline create a supernatural mystery that's worth solving." However, the reviewer found fault with the exposition heavy midsection. Anime on DVD praised the "surprising amount of depth" and the "intriguing" plot, but had some concerns about the characters.

References

2001 Japanese novels
2005 manga
Anime and manga based on light novels
ASCII Media Works manga
Kadokawa Dwango franchises
Dengeki Bunko
Japanese horror novels
Japanese serial novels
Light novels
Tokyopop titles
Seinen manga